The German version of The Biggest Loser started in 2009 on ProSieben. The following seasons switched channels inside the ProSiebenSat.1 network, season two and three airing on kabel eins and since season four on Sat.1.

Series overview

Trainers

Winners

Seasons on ProSieben

Season One 
Season one was shown on ProSieben in early 2009. The show was hosted by retired figure skater Katharina Witt and filmed on a Hacienda near Budapest. The season consisted of 7 episodes and featured 14 candidates contesting for a 100,000 € first prize. The season had mostly negative critiques and was not renewed. The season was won by Enrico Proba who lost over 50% of his starting weight. He won the first prize of 100,000 €, Falko gained 10,000 € for second and René got 5,000 €. After the show, Enrico works in dietics and is a fitness trainer.

Seasons on kabel eins

Season Two 
Season two of The Biggest Loser was held in 2010 on Mallorca. The slogan of that season was Abspecken im Doppelpack (Losing weight in double pack). The host was retired boxer Regina Halmich. There were eight teams with 2 persons each. One team was evicted each week until three were left, after which the teams were dissolved and everyone was as individuals. The first prize was much lower this season with the winner getting only 25,000 € and nothing going to second and third place. The biggest loser title was won by Heino from Hamburg who shared the prize with his teammate Sven, who finished third.

Season Three 
After the success of season two with average market shares of 6.4% within the target group of 14- to 49-year-olds Kabel Eins announced a season three for March 2011. The will be no changes in host or trainers, and the show will be taped in Ischgl, Austria.

The season started on 15 March 2011 and featured 9 couples. The winner received 25.000 €.

Seasons on Sat.1 
All of these seasons were hosted in Andalusia.

Season Four 
In 2012 a fourth season was shown on Sat.1 with kickboxer Christine Theiss as a new host.

Season Five 
In 2013 Biggest Loser returned for a fifth season.

Season Six 
In 2014 there was a sixth season. The episodes were aired every Wednesday at 8:15 pm. There also was a Biggest Loser Teens season in the second half of the year.

Season Seven 
In 2015 Biggest Loser returned for a seventh season. Eight men and eight women completed under the motto men versus women.

References

External links
 Official Sat 1 Site
 Official Kabel Eins Site

Germany
2009 German television series debuts
German television series based on American television series